This was the first edition of the tournament.

Marta Kostyuk and Kamilla Rakhimova won the title, defeating Paula Kania and Anastasiya Shoshyna in the final, 6–3, 2–6, [10–6].

Seeds

Draw

Draw

References
Main Draw

Zed Tennis Open 2 - Doubles